George Anderson Wells  was the second Bishop of Cariboo. He was born at Clarke's Beach, Newfoundland on 18 November 1877, educated at St John's College, Winnipeg (where he was later Warden)  and ordained in 1911. He died on 10 April 1964.

During the Second World War, Wells was Chaplain of the Fleet (Protestant) in the Royal Canadian Navy.

Notes

1877 births
1964 deaths
University of Manitoba alumni
Anglican bishops of Cariboo
20th-century Anglican Church of Canada bishops
Canadian Companions of the Order of St Michael and St George
Canadian military chaplains